Knights of the Sun is the third extended play from South Korean boy band SF9. It was released on October 12, 2017, by FNC Entertainment. The album consists of six tracks, including the title track, "O Sole Mio".

Commercial performance
The EP sold 32,864+ copies in South Korea. It peaked at number 6 on the Korean Gaon Chart.

Track listing

References

2017 EPs
SF9 (band) EPs
FNC Entertainment EPs
Kakao M EPs